Desserette is a historic plantation house and national historic district located near White Oak, Bladen County, North Carolina.  The house was built about 1840, and is a two-story, frame double-pile house in the Greek Revival style.  It rests on a brick pier foundation and has a hipped roof.  Also on the property are the contributing kitchen, meathouse, log barn, and family cemetery.

It was added to the National Register of Historic Places in 1987.

References

Historic districts on the National Register of Historic Places in North Carolina
Plantation houses in North Carolina
Houses on the National Register of Historic Places in North Carolina
Greek Revival houses in North Carolina
Houses completed in 1840
Houses in Bladen County, North Carolina
National Register of Historic Places in Bladen County, North Carolina